Matúš Holenda (born 20 April 1995) is a Slovak professional ice hockey defenceman for HC '05 Banská Bystrica of the Slovak Extraliga.

Holenda began his career with his hometown team HK Dukla Trenčín and played 241 games for the team from 2012 to 2019. He also had loan spells with HK Trnava, HK Dukla Senica and HK 95 Panthers Považská Bystrica. On 8 August 2020 Holenda signed for HC Nové Zámky.

Career statistics

Regular season and playoffs

International

References

External links
 

1995 births
Living people
HK Dukla Trenčín players
HC Nové Zámky players
HK 95 Panthers Považská Bystrica players
HK 91 Senica players
Slovak ice hockey defencemen
Sportspeople from Trenčín
HK Trnava players
HC '05 Banská Bystrica players